Michauxia campanuloides, the rough-leaved michauxia, is an ornamental plant in the Campanulaceae (bellflower) family. It is native to Greece, Turkey, Syria, Lebanon, Palestine, Israel.

Description
From rosettes of basal lanceolate and lobed leaves arise flowering stems up to 2 m high, branched towards the top carrying many drooping flowers of white, tinged with purple, with 8-10 long narrow reflexed lobes and long-projecting style. Flowers April–July.

Habitat
Stony and rocky places.

Gallery

References

External links
Michauxia campanuloides photo

Campanuloideae
Flora of Greece
Flora of Turkey
Flora of Lebanon and Syria
Flora of Palestine (region)
Plants described in 1788